The Thoresby Society is the historical society for the City of Leeds in West Yorkshire, England, and the surrounding district. It was founded in 1889 and named after the historian of Leeds, Ralph Thoresby (1658–1725).

History and name
The Society takes its name from Ralph Thoresby (1658–1725), the first historian of Leeds and a pioneer in the field of local history. It was founded in 1889 and by the end of that year had 172 subscribers. By 1912 this had grown to 397, and by 1986 reached 528. The society's activities have included publication of transcriptions of local records and of original research, lectures, and "the educational and social pleasures of imaginatively organised excursions" (423 of which took place in its first 100 years).

Aims 
The objects of the Society, as set out in the Memorandum of Association, are:

To be the premier history society of Leeds and its neighbourhood and accordingly to cultivate an interest in the history of Leeds and its neighbourhood through the collection and preservation of books, documents and other matter that may assist this purpose;

To promote the dissemination of knowledge by all appropriate means of the history of Leeds and its neighbourhood and to promote a wide public interest therein;

To oversee the publication of documents, monographs and papers relating to the history of Leeds and its neighbourhood.

Library and archives
The Society maintains a large library of books relating to the history of Leeds and District, and conserves an archive of papers and images relating to Leeds.

The Society's Library was moved in 2015 into the Leeds Library, where it is available for public access.

List of publications

First series
 I 	Leeds Parish Church Registers, First and Second Books, 1572–1612; ed. by Samuel Margerison; 1891
 II 	Miscellanea I; 1891
 III 	Leeds Parish Church Registers, Third and Fourth Books, 1612–1639; ed. by G. D. Lumb; 1895
 IV 	Miscellanea II; ed. by E. Kitson Clark; 1895
 V 	Adel Parish Church Registers, 1606–1812, and Monumental Inscriptions; ed. by G. D. Lumb; 1895
 VI 	Calverley Charters presented to the British Museum by Sir Walter Calverley Trevelyan, Baronet, Volume I. Transcribed by S. Margerison and ed. by W. Paley Baildon and S. Margerison; 1904
 VII 	Leeds Parish Church Registers, 1639–1667, Fifth and Sixth Books; ed. by, G. D. Lumb; 1897
 VIII 	Coucher Book of the Cistercian Abbey of Kirkstall, in W.R.Yorks, Printed from the Original Preserved in the Public Record Office; ed. by W. T. Lancaster and W. Paley Baildon; 1904
 IX 	Miscellanea III; ed. by E. Kitson Clark; 1899
 X 	Leeds Parish Church Registers, 1667–1695, Seventh and Eighth Books; ed. by G. D. Lumb; 1901
 XI 	Miscellanea IV; ed. by E. Kitson Clark; 1904
 XII 	Methley Parish Church Registers, 1560–1812; transcribed and ed. by G. D. Lumb; 1903
 XIII 	Leeds Parish Church Registers, 1695–1722, Ninth and Tenth Books, with Armley Chapel, 1695–1711, and Hunslet Chapel, 1686–1724; ed. by G. D. Lumb; 1909
 XIV 	Leeds Grammar School Admission Books, 1820–1900; ed. and annotated by Edmund Wilson; 1906
 XV 	Miscellanea V; ed. by B. P. Scattergood; 1909
 XVI 	Architectural Description of Kirkstall Abbey; by W. H. St. John Hope and John Bilson; 1907
 XVII 	History of the Parish of Barwick-in-Elmet;by F. S. Colman; 1908
 XVIII 	Place-Names of the West Riding of Yorkshire; investigated by F. W. Moorman; 1910
 XIX 	Testamenta Leodiensia; Wills of Leeds, Pontefract, Wakefield, Otley and District, 1539–1553; extracted and ed. by G. D. Lumb; 1913
 XX 	Leeds Parish Church Registers, 1722–1757, Eleventh and Twelfth Books: ed. by G.D. Lumb; 1914
 XXI 	Letters Addressed to Ralph Thoresby, printed from the originals in the possession of the Yorkshire Archaeological Society; ed. by W. T. Lancaster; 1912
 XXII 	Miscellanea VI; ed. by G. D. I.umb; 1915
 XXIII 	Registers of the Chapels of the Parish Church of Leeds. 1724–1703, with a few earlier years (St. John's, Holy Trinity, Armley, Beeston, Bramley, Chapel Allerton, Farnley, Headingley, Holbeck and Hunslet), First and Second Books; transcribed and ed. by G. D. Lumb; 1916
 XXIV 	Miscellanea VII; ed. by G. D. Lumb; 1919
 XXV 	Leeds Parish Church Registers: Baptisms and Burials, 1757–1776 (Thirteenth and Fourteenth Books); Marriages, 1754–1769; transcribed by J. Singleton; ed. by J. Singleton and Miss Emily Hargrave; 1923
 XXVI 	Miscellanea VIII ed. by G. D. Lumb; 1924
 XXVII 	Testamenta Leodiensia; Wills of Leeds. Pontefract, Wakefield, Otley and District, 1553–1561; extracted and ed. by G. D. Lumb; 1930. Part1 1919, Part 2 1921
 XXVIII 	Miscellanea IX; ed. by G. D. Lumb; 1928
 XXIX 	Registers of the Chapels of St. John, Holy Trinity, Headingley, Bramley, Beeston, Chapel Allerton and Farnley, all in the Parish of Leeds, 1763–1812, and in some cases later years; ed, by G. P. Lumb; 1928
 XXX 	History and Description of the Priory of St. Mary, Bolton-in-Wharfedale, with some Account of the Canons Regular of the Order of St. Augustine and their Houses in Yorkshire; by A. Hamilton Thompson; 1928
 XXXI 	Registers of the Chapels of the Parish Church of Leeds, 1764–1812: Holbeck, Armley and Hunslet; ed. by G. D. Lumb; 1934
 XXXII 	Leeds Woollen Industry, 1780–1820; ed. by W. B. Crump; 1931
 XXXIII 	Miscellanea X; ed. by G. D. Lumb; 1935
 XXXIV 	Court Books of the Leeds Corporation: First Book, 1662–1705; transcribed by J. G.Clark; 1936
 XXXV 	History of Methley: ed. by H S. Darbyshire and G. D. Lumb; 1937
 XXXVI 	Parish Register of Aberford, 1510–1812; transcribed and ed. by G. D. Lumb; 1937
 XXXVII. 	Miscellany XI; ed. by G. D. Lumb and W. B. Crump. 1945.
 XXXVIII. 	Extracts from The Leeds Intelligencer and The Leeds Mercury, 1769–1776: ed. by G. D, Lumb. 1938.
 XXXIX. 	Yorkshire fairs and markets, to the end of the eighteenth century; by K, L. McCutcheon. 1940.
 Mon. I. 	Thomas Taylor: Regency architect, Leeds; by F. Beckwith. 1949.
 Mon. II. 	A survey of the plate of Leeds Parish Church and its ancient chapelries; by J. Sprittles. 1951.
 Mon. III. 	Social reform in Victorian Leeds: the work of James Hole, 1820–1895; by J. F. C. Harrison. 1954.
 XL. 	Extracts from The Leeds Intelligencer and The Leeds Mercury, 1777–1782; ed. by G. D. Lumb and J. B. Place; with an introductory account of The Leeds Intelligencer, 1754–1866, by F. Beckwith, 1955.
 XLI. 	Miscellany XII. 1954.
 XLII. 	The Kirkstall Abbey chronicles; ed. by John Taylor. 1952.
 XLIII. 	Kirkstall Abbey excavations, 1950–1954. 1955.
 XLIV. 	Extracts from The Leeds Intelligencer, 1791–1796; ed. by G. D. Lumb. 1956.
 XLV. 	Documents relating to the manor and borough of Leeds, 1066–1400; ed. by John Le Patourel. 1957.
 XLVI. 	Miscellany XIII. 1963.
 XLVII. 	Printed maps and plans of Leeds, 1711–1900; compiled by K. J. Bonser and H. Nichols, 1960.
 XLVIII. 	Kirkstall Abbey excavations, 1955–1959. 1961.
 XLIX. 	Pontefract Priory excavations, 1957–1961; by C. V. Bellamy. 1965.
 L. 	Miscellany XIV. 1968.
 LI. 	Kirkstall Abbey excavations, 1960–1964, with appraisal of results since 1950. 1967.
 LII. 	Links with Bygone Leeds, by J. Sprittles. 1969.
 LIII. 	Miscellany 15. 1971–73.
 LIV. 	Miscellany 16. 1974–79.
 LV. 	Leeds and the Oxford Movement, by Nigel Yates. 1975.
 LVI. 	Miscellany 17. 1979–81.
 LVII. 	The Manor and Borough of Leeds, 1425–1662: an edition of documents, edited by J. W. Kirby. 1983.
 LVIII. 	Kirkstall Abbey, 1147–1539: an historical study, by Guy D. Barnes.1984.
 	
 LIX. 	Miscellany 18. 1985–86.
 LX-LXI. 	East End, West End: the face of Leeds during urbanisation, 1684–1842, by Maurice W. Beresford. 1988.
 LXII. 	The Georgian Public Buildings of Leeds and the West Riding, by Kevin Grady. 1989.
 LXIII. 	Miscellany 19. 1990.
 LXIV. 	CENTENARY EDITION 1989 MISCELLANY Leeds in the seventeenth and early eighteenth centuries

Second Series
 1. Miscellany. 1991.
 2. R. D. Chantrell, Architect: his life and work in Leeds, 1818–1847, by Christopher Webster. 1992. 
 3. Miscellany. 1993.
 4. Miscellany. 1994.
 5. Miscellany. 1995.
 6. The Fawkes Family and their Estates in Wharfedale, 1819–1936, by Marion Sharples. 1997. 
 7. Church Architecture in Leeds, 1700–1799, by Terry Friedman. 1997. 
 8. Miscellany. 1998.
 9. The Moravian Settlement at Fulneck, 1742–1790, by Geoffrey Stead. 1999. 
 10. Miscellany. 2000. index to vols lii–lxiv; second series vols 1–14 3
 11. Miscellany. 2001.
 12. Anglican Resurgence under W. F. Hook in Early Victorian Leeds: Church Life in a Nonconformist Town, 1836–1851, by Harry W. Dalton. 2002. 
 13. Miscellany. 2003.
 14. Miscellany. 2004.
 15. More Annals of Leeds 1880–1920. William Benn. 2005 
 16. The Memoranda Book of John Lucas 1712–1750. 2006 
 17. The Monuments of the Parish Church of St Peter-at-Leeds, by Margaret Pullan, 2007 
 Leeds in Maps Leeds Library and Information Service, The Thoresby Society, Yorkshire Evening Post. 2007
 18. Miscellany. 2008 
 19. Miscellany. 2009 
 20. Miscellany. 2010 
 21. The Thursby Manuscripts. ed. Peter Meredith. 2011 
 22. Headingley-cum-Burley c.1544–c.1784. John Cruikshank. 2012 
 23. The Burial Ground Problem in Leeds, c.1700–1914. Jim Morgan. 2013 
 24. Miscellany. 2014 
 25. The Notebooks of Robert Pounder. ed. Ann Alexander 2015 
 Ducatus Tercentenary
Volume One – A Celebration of Ralph Thoresby 2015.
Volume Two – Ralph Thoresby's Review of his Life, 1658–1714 ed. Peter Meredith. 2015
 26. Voices from Wartime Leeds: Three Mass Observation Diaries ed. Patricia & Robert Malcolmson 
 27 & 28 Libraries in Leeds: A Historical Survey 1152 – c.1939. Peter Morrish, 2019
 29. Miscellany. 2019 
 30. Miscellany. 2020 
 31. Knowing One's Place: Community and Class in the Industrial Suburbs of Leeds during the Eighteenth and Nineteenth Centuries, Robin Pearson, 2022.

References

External links 

Organisations based in Leeds
1889 establishments in England
Text publication societies
History of Leeds
History of Yorkshire
Historical societies of the United Kingdom